In the study of Dirac fields in quantum field theory, Richard Feynman invented the convenient Feynman slash notation (less commonly known as the Dirac slash notation). If A is a covariant vector (i.e., a 1-form),

where γ are the gamma matrices.  Using the Einstein summation notation, the expression is simply 

.

Identities

where  is the identity matrix in four dimensions.

In particular,

Further identities can be read off directly from the gamma matrix identities by replacing the metric tensor with inner products. For example,

where  is the Levi-Civita symbol.

With four-momentum
This section uses the  metric signature. Often, when using the Dirac equation and solving for cross sections, one finds the slash notation used on four-momentum: using the Dirac basis for the gamma matrices,

as well as the definition of contravariant four-momentum in natural units,

we see explicitly that

Similar results hold in other bases, such as the Weyl basis.

See also
Weyl basis
Gamma matrices

References

 

Quantum field theory
Spinors
Richard Feynman

de:Dirac-Matrizen#Feynman-Slash-Notation